is a passenger railway station located in Chūō-ku, Chiba, Chiba Prefecture, Japan, operated by the East Japan Railway Company (JR East).

Lines
Hamano Station is served by the Uchibo Line, and is located 3.4 km from the starting point of the line at Soga Station.

Station layout
The station is an above-ground station with an elevated station building, and has two sets of tracks running around an island platform. The station is attended.

Platforms

History
Hamano Station was opened on March 28, 1912 as a station on the Japanese Government Railways (JGR) Kisarazu Line. On May 24, 1919, the line's name changed to the Hōjō Line, and on April 15, 1929 to the Bōsō Line and on April 1, 1933 to the Bōsōnishi Line. It became part of the Japan National Railways (JNR) after World War II, and the line was renamed the Uchibō Line from July 15, 1972. Hamano Station was absorbed into the JR East network upon the privatization of the Japan National Railways (JNR) on April 1, 1987. After schedule changes from December 2007, express trains connecting directly to the Keiyō Line and Sōbu Line also stop at this station. The platform length was extended from November 2007 to facilitate stopping of high speed trains.

Passenger statistics
In fiscal 2019, the station was used by an average of 7519 passengers daily (boarding passengers only).

Surroundings
 
starting point of 
Chiba Prefectural Oihama High School
Chiba Municipal Oihama Elementary School
Chiba Municipal Oihama West Elementary School
Chiba Municipal Oihama East Elementary School
Hamano Kindergarten

See also
 List of railway stations in Japan

References

External links

  JR East Station information

Railway stations in Japan opened in 1912
Railway stations in Chiba Prefecture
Uchibō Line
Railway stations in Chiba (city)